Lyn Collingwood (born 6 September 1936, Sydney), credited also as Lynn Collingwood, is an Australian actress.

Biography

Collingwood was born in Sydney, New South Wales, in 1936, and did not start a career in the arts until later in life, she previously had worked as a social worker and English, drama and history teacher.

She appeared in a few TV roles starting from the late 1970s, and was cast as gossip comic character Colleen Smart, (later Stewart), in a similar vein to soap opera gossips like A Country Practice character Esme Watson (Joyce Jacobs) and Neighbours Mrs. Mangel (Vivean Gray) and on soap opera Home and Away and was a recurring original character in 1988 to 1989. In 1997 she returned for a guest appearance, and then returned in 1999 as a regular character until leaving in May 2012, after playing the role of Colleen for 13 years, she made a brief guest return to the series on 27 November 2012.

Lynn has had roles in numerous serials such as E Street,  G.P. and All Saints.

She has also worked in research and as an editor of The Australian Encyclopaedia, as well as The Cambridge Encyclopaedia of Australia and The New Age Encyclopaedia.

Television series

Filmography

References

 Lyn Collingwood biography, Home and Away, Network Seven.

1936 births
Living people
Australian film actresses
Australian soap opera actresses